Testudinaria is a genus of orb-weaver spiders first described by Władysław Taczanowski in 1879.

Species
 it contains nine species:
Testudinaria bonaldoi Levi, 2005 – Brazil
Testudinaria debsmithae Levi, 2005 – Suriname to Peru, Bolivia
Testudinaria elegans Taczanowski, 1879 – Panama to Peru
Testudinaria geometrica Taczanowski, 1879 (type) – Panama to Peru, Brazil
Testudinaria gravatai Levi, 2005 – Brazil
Testudinaria lemniscata (Simon, 1893) – Brazil
Testudinaria quadripunctata Taczanowski, 1879 – Venezuela to Peru, Bolivia, Brazil
Testudinaria rosea (Mello-Leitão, 1945) – Argentina
Testudinaria unipunctata (Simon, 1893) – Brazil

References

External links 

Araneidae
Araneomorphae genera